The 1992 Thomas & Uber Cup was the 17th tournament of the Thomas Cup, and the 14th tournament of the Uber Cup, which are the major international team competitions in world badminton. The 1992 final stage was held in Kuala Lumpur, Malaysia, on May 16, 1992.

Thomas Cup

Teams
54 teams took part in the competition, and eight teams qualified for the final Stage, including China, as defending champion, and Malaysia, as host team.

Final stage

Group A

Group B

Knockout stage

Semi-finals

Final

Uber Cup

Teams
44 teams took part in the competition, and eight teams qualified for the final Stage.

Final stage

Group A

Group B

Knockout stage

Semi-finals

Final

References

New Straits Times - 17 May 1992

External links
 Mike's Badminton Populorum - Uber Cup
 Mike's Badminton Populorum - Thomas Cup

Thomas & Uber Cup
Thomas Uber Cup
Thomas Uber Cup
Badminton tournaments in Malaysia
Sport in Kuala Lumpur
Thomas and Uber Cup